Dancing with Strangers is the ninth studio album by British singer-songwriter Chris Rea, released in 1987. It became Rea's first major success in the UK, peaking at No. 2 behind Michael Jackson's Bad, and spent 46 weeks in the charts before going platinum. The album entered the Top 10 in six other European countries, and topped the chart in New Zealand.

"Let's Dance" was released as the first single and peaked at No. 12 in the UK, and climbed to No. 2 in New Zealand. It was followed by "Loving You Again", "Joys of Christmas" and "Que Sera". The album features renowned Irish piper Davy Spillane.

Production
Rea had put a multi-track recording desk in his garage, and "made the whole album with three microphones. Nobody heard it, nobody witnessed it", he said. "It was just me having fun." It was "the first time Rea had demoed and partly recorded the album at home", which "gave him more control and helped cement his vision".

Despite the lead single's success, subsequent singles fared relatively poorly in the UK charts, with "Loving You Again" reaching No. 47, "Joys of Christmas" making it to No. 67 and "Que Sera" reaching No. 73. The latter shares a verse taken from an earlier song from the eponymous Chris Rea, called "When You Know Your Love Has Died."

Dancing With Strangers, along with four other albums from Rea's commercial peak, was remastered and reissued as a double album, with the first disc consisting of the original LP, and the second containing bonus material including singles, along with alternative and live versions.

Track listing
All songs by Chris Rea.
 "Joys of Christmas" – 5:15
 "I Can't Dance to That" – 4:19
 "Windy Town" – 4:25
 "Gonna Buy a Hat" – 4:25
 "Curse of the Traveller" – 6:26
 "Let's Dance" – 4:07
 "Que Sera" – 5:23
 "Josie's Tune" – 2:19
 "Loving You Again" – 5:40
 "That Girl of Mine" – 3:41
 "September Blue" – 3:09
 "I Don't Care Any More" – 2:10
 "Donahue's Broken Wheel" – 3:02
 "Danielle's Breakfast" – 4:33

Tracks 12, 13 and 14 are bonus tracks not available on the initial LP release.

Personnel 
 Chris Rea – vocals, guitar (1, 2, 6), accordion (1, 4, 10), harmonica (1, 2, 7), brass (1, 4, 6, 7, 9), acoustic guitar (3), rhythm guitar (3), banjo (3), slide guitar (4, 10), all other guitars (5, 7), keyboards (6, 7), acoustic piano (7), all other instruments (8), all guitars (9), strings (9), lead guitar (10), all instruments (11-14)
 Kevin Leach – acoustic piano (2, 3, 5, 9, 10), organ (2, 5, 7), Hammond organ (4)
 Jerry Donahue – lead guitar (3, 4, 7), acoustic guitar (3), rhythm guitar (5, 10)
 Eoghan O'Neill – bass (1-7, 9, 10), drums (1), percussion (1)
 Martin Ditcham – drums (2-7, 9, 10), percussion (2, 3, 5, 6, 7, 9, 10)
 Davy Spillane – Uilleann pipes (3, 5, 8, 10), low whistle (3, 5, 8, 10)

Production 
 Chris Rea – producer, mixing 
 Stewart Eales – engineer
 Jean Jacques Lemoine – engineer
 Justin Shirley-Smith – engineer
 Jon Kelly – mixing
 Willie Grimston – coordination
 Mark Entwistle – cover illustration
 Shoot That Tiger! – sleeve design 
 Jim Beach – management 
 Paul Lilly – management

Studios
 Recorded at Mountain Studios (Montreux, Switzerland); Studio Miraval (Le Val, France); Hartmann Digital (Bavaria, Germany).
 Mixed at Studio Miraval

Charts

Weekly charts

Year-end charts

Certifications

References 

1987 albums
Chris Rea albums
Magnet Records albums